Dream Warriors may refer to:

 Dream Warriors (band), Canadian hip hop duo
 "Dream Warriors" (song), song by American metal band Dokken
 A Nightmare on Elm Street 3: Dream Warriors, 1987 American slasher fantasy film